Darren Harris (born 17 August 1965) is a former Australian rules footballer who played with North Melbourne in the Victorian Football League (VFL) and Australian Football League (AFL) between 1986 and 1991.  Originally from South Australian National Football League (SANFL) club South Adelaide, his brother Brenton Harris also played two games for North Melbourne in 1988. Darren is also the father of 2 daughters, Bella Harris and Olympic Gold Medalist (favourite daughter) Meg Harris

Harris played with Albury in the Ovens & Murray Football League from 1994 to 1996, kicking 162 goals.

References

External links

Living people
1965 births
Australian rules footballers from South Australia
North Melbourne Football Club players
South Adelaide Football Club players
Reynella Football Club players